Fenerbahçe SK, a major Turkish multi-sport club based in Istanbul, Turkey, have developed a strong following since their foundation in 1907. They are the second most popular football club in Turkey, with 35% of Turkey supporting them, and the most popular in Istanbul and Ankara. Fenerbahçe have a large fanbase throughout in Turkey, Northern Cyprus, Azerbaijan, South Korea and in the Turkish diaspora. There are also fans from other Muslim communities in the world, as well as minorities in Turkey such as Circassians and Kurds. The supporters are known for their passionate, fierce, and unwavering support. In their home at the Şükrü Saracoğlu Stadium, Fenerbahçe's average attendances have been among the highest in Turkey.

Many fanzines, blogs, podcasts, forums and fan websites have been dedicated to the club and the fans have long-standing rivalries with several other clubs; the most notable of these is with neighbours Galatasaray with whom they regularly contest the Intercontinental derby, and Beşiktaş, with whom they regularly contest the Beşiktaş-Fenerbahçe derby with.

The supporters of Fenerbahçe SK are well known for their passionate, fierce, and unwavering support. The supporters' motto is "Hep Destek Tam Destek", abbreviated as "HDTD" (English: "Continuous Unwavering Support", Spanish: "Te Apoyo Siempre, Te Apoyo Entodo").

Rivalries
An 2000s survey found that Fenerbahçe supporters only see the Istanbul giants as their rivals and most dislike Galatasaray, followed by Trabzonspor and Beşiktaş, although all of Galatasaray, Beşiktaş, and Trabzonspor fans see Fenerbahçe as their main rival, mostly due to Fenerbahçe by itself dominating Turkish football for many years in the past.

Fenerbahçe-Galatasaray rivalry 
Fenerbahçe's longest-running and deepest rivalry is with their nearest major neighbours, Galatasaray, with matches between the two being referred to as Intercontinental derby, also known as "the derby of immense and never ending hate". In an interview, a Fenerbahçe fan stated "I'd prefer dying honorfully and meeting my creator to living as a Galatasaray fan. Actually, I'd prefer going to hell over being a Galatasaray fan" while a Galatasaray fan stated "My hate for Fenerbahçe is more than any feeling I ever had. If Fenerbahçe was a person, I'd murder him". The derby is very popular, and during the derby hours traffic in Turkey is significantly relaxed as most are at their home watching, and the hate between the two clubs Fenerbahçe and Galatasaray has reached such a level that many fans of both clubs have died from heart attack after their clubs have lost the derby. Both Fenerbahçe and Galatasaray also have a global following, Galatasaray is more popular in Europe and the United States, and Fenerbahçe is more popular in Muslim majority countries and the United Kingdom.

The rivalry, previously named "the derby of friendship", has turned into a derby of hate on 23 February 1934, when a friendly game between both clubs turned into a riot, forcing the match to be abandoned. The rivalry has led to violence among supporters on numerous occasions. Torches, smoke, flags, and giant posters are used to create visual grandeur and apply psychological pressure on visiting teams, which fans call "welcoming them to hell".

Other rivalries 
Matches against Beşiktaş are also derbys, but the rivalry is not as intense and fierce as that between Fenerbahçe SK and Galatasaray SK. These derbys are referred to as the "friendly derby". In addition, Fenerbahçe and Trabzonspor have had a strong on-pitch rivalry in the late 1970s, which has, although not so much on the pitch anymore, continued in recent years off the pitch with hate among fanbases growing rapidly especially after 2011.

Friendships with other clubs 

Fenerbahçe has had friendly relations with clubs from different countries, due to many reasons. Some include: in Turkey, Kırklarelispor, Menemenspor, Eskişehir Demirspor, Ankara Demirspor, Eskişehirspor and many more; in Brazil, Coritiba; in Serbia, Novi Pazar; in Norway: Lillestrøm, in Greece; AEK andPanathinaikos; in England, Sheffield United; in the Netherlands, Feyenoord; in Germany: Bayern Munich. In addition to this, Fenerbahçe, Beşiktaş and Galatasaray were officially brother clubs in the 1910s, due to the fact that their common goal was to defeat non-Muslim teams. This, however, is no longer the case.

In November 2011, Fenerbahçe's GFB created a friendly relationship with Serbian club FK Novi Pazar's supporter group Torcida Sandžak. During a Turkish Super League match against İstanbul Büyükşehir Belediyespor at the Şükrü Saracoğlu Stadium, the GFB and 1907 Gençlik stands deployed a giant banner reading "Kalbimiz Seninle Novi Pazar" ("Novi Pazar, Our Hearts Are With You").  Eventually, in the match against Radnički Kragujevac in the Serbian SuperLiga, Torcida Sandžak members deployed a banner reading "Sancak'ta atıyor, Fenerbahçe'nin kalbi" ("The heart of Fenerbahçe beats in Sandžak").

On March 2, 2012, Fenerbahçe's GFB and 1907 Gençlik group members were invited to Novi Pazar for the match against Partizan in the Serbian SuperLiga. Thousands of Torcida Sandžak members welcomed GFB and 1907 Gençlik's 17 members.

Since 2016, there have been ties between circles of supporters of Fenerbahçe and Panathinaikos in an effort to combat nationalism on both sides, yet those relationships are to be formalized at a central level. Gate 13, the central club of Panathinaikos supporters, supported officially with a press release Fenerbahçe prior to the final match of Basketball Euroleague against Olympiakos in 2017.

There is an informal friendship and fraternization between the fans of AEK and Fenerbahçe. In the 2017 Euroleague final, Fenerbahçe S.K. supporters displayed a banner which read "Same City's Sons"

Incidents 
In 13 December 1993, a Fenerbahçe fan was beaten to death by Beşiktaş fans in a cafe after celebrating the Fenerbahçe victory.

In the 1995–96 season, Fenerbahçe were the unmatched dominating force in football while Galatasaray were considered a smaller team. When Galatasaray reached the cup final against Fenerbahçe, Fenerbahçe were expected to win easily, however Galatasaray beat Fenerbahçe in the first leg by a Dean Saunders penalty. Their manager Graeme Souness took a giant Galatasaray flag after the match and planted it in the centre of the pitch and insulted Fenerbahçe and its supporters in order to provoke and anger the Fenerbahçe fans.

In 1996, after a derby match, 3 Galatasaray supporters were stabbed to death by a Fenerbahçe stand leader, known as Esenlerli Sebo.

In 2006 Galatasaray supporters opened a racist banner which targeted Mehmet Aurélio, player of Fenerbahçe and the Turkish national team with Brazilian roots. The Fenerbahçe supporters protested which resulted in them getting attacked by Galatasaray fans.

In 2012, a Galatasaray supporter named Ugur Fakili was stabbed to death by a Fenerbahçe fan with whom he had an argument before the match.

On 13 May 2013, a Fenerbahçe fan was stabbed multiple times to death after the Intercontinental Derby. After the match, which resulted in a 2–1 victory for Fenerbahçe, the 19 year old Fenerbahçe fan was on his way home after the match when he and his companions were attacked by Galatasaray fans.

On 27 July 2022, during the UEFA Champions League qualifier game against Dynamo Kiev, there were chants supporting Vladimir Putin by the Fenerbahçe fans. The Fenerbahçe's president said that the club will not apologise for the chants. The game played during the 2022 Russian invasion of Ukraine.

Police and community relations
Fenerbahçe supporters do not have good relations with police forces around the country and especially the General Directorate of Security. This is because of their general opposition to the Erdogan government.

Notable supporters
Below is a list of people who are known as Fenerbahçe SK supporters:

Presidents of Turkey
Mustafa Kemal Atatürk
Cevdet Sunay
Fahri Korutürk
Kenan Evren
Turgut Özal
Recep Tayyip Erdoğan

Presidents of Northern Cyprus
Rauf Denktaş

Prime Ministers of Turkey
Yıldırım Aktuna
Necmettin Erbakan
Şükrü Saraçoğlu (has also been Fenerbahçe's 16th president between 1934 and 1950)
Ahmet Davutoğlu

Ministers of Turkey

Other politicians 

 Kemal Kılıçdaroğlu
 Alparslan Türkeş

Chief of the Turkish General Staff 
Hilmi Özkök
Yaşar Büyükanıt
İlker Başbuğ
Işık Koşaner

Istanbul Governors
Muammer Güler

British Ambassadors
Dominick Chilcott

Actors and actresses

Musicians

Television & radio personalities

Writers and novelists

Historians 

 Emrah Safa Gürkan

Sports people

Other business people

Religious speakers

References

Supporters
Association football supporters
Turkish football supporters' associations